Mount Niles is a  summit located in the Waputik Range of Yoho National Park, in the Canadian Rockies of British Columbia, Canada. The nearest higher peak is Mount Daly,  to the immediate northeast. Takakkaw Falls is situated four km to the west, the Waputik Icefield lies to the north, and Sherbrooke Lake lies to the south. Precipitation runoff from Mount Niles drains into the Yoho River and Niles Creek, both tributaries of the Kicking Horse River. Topographic relief is significant as the summit rises approximately 1,500 meters (4,920 feet) above Yoho Valley in four kilometers (2.5 mile).

History

Charles Sproull Thompson (1869–1921) named the peak in 1898, for William H. Niles (1838–1910), president of the Appalachian Mountain Club and Professor of Geology at Massachusetts Institute of Technology who also did some mountaineering in the area. 

The first ascent of the mountain was made in 1898 by D. Campbell and Charles E. Fay.

The mountain's toponym was officially adopted in 1924 by the Geographical Names Board of Canada.

Geology

Mount Niles is composed of sedimentary rock laid down during the Precambrian to Jurassic periods. Formed in shallow seas, this sedimentary rock was pushed east and over the top of younger rock during the Laramide orogeny.

Climate

Based on the Köppen climate classification, Mount Niles is located in a subarctic climate zone with cold, snowy winters, and mild summers. Winter temperatures can drop below −20 °C with wind chill factors below −30 °C.

Gallery

See also

Geography of British Columbia

References

External links
 Weather: Mount Niles
 Parks Canada web site: Yoho National Park

Niles
Canadian Rockies
Mountains of Yoho National Park
Kootenay Land District